Gandhigiri (Hindi: गांधीगीरी) is a 2016 Indian Hindi-Language film directed by Sanoj Mishra and produced by Pratap Singh Yadav.

Synopsis

The film tells the story of Rai Saheb, a Non-Resident Indian who returns to India. He is a strong believer in the principles given by Gandhiji. His father played an active role in the freedom struggle and was closely associated with him. In India, he meets four different people who have taken the wrong path due to various circumstances. Saheb makes them understand the importance of Gandhi's principles. Additionally, it exhibits how Gandhian values continue to remain relevant and can bring peace if implemented effectively.

Cast

 Om Puri as Rai Saheb
 Sanjay Mishra as Bakait Singh
 Brijesh Karniwal as Bansi
 Anupam Shyam as Kranti Pandey
 Mukesh Tiwari as Natvarlal
 Meghna Haldar as Jayanti
 Dolly Chawala as Disha
 Amit Shukla as Inspector 
 Rishi Bhutani as Yuvraj
 Ravi Singh as Rajaram Pandey
 Ram Sujan Singh as Salfas Baba
 Naveen Sharma as Dhananjay Panday
 Vikrant Anand (guest appearance)
 Vijay Raaz (Narrator)
 Virendra Singh as Mohammed Khalil
 Niranjan Chaubey as Deendayal
 Anita sahgal as Yuvraj Mother
 Rakesh Tripathi as Daya Nai
 Yashartha Srivastav
 Naveen Sharma
 Aditya Roy

Production

Gandhigiri was produced by Aagman Films Pvt. Ltd. and directed by Sanoj Mishra. The singers were Ankit Tiwari, Sunidhi Chouhan, Mohammad Irfaan, Sujata Majumdar and Masha. Editing was by Archit D Rastogi. The Sound was engineered by Subhash Sahoo. Background Score was composed by Salil Amrute. The associate director was Vikas Kumar Singh. Post production was handled by Dl & VFX - After Studio.

The film was shot in Lucknow, Raebareli, Uttar Pradesh.

Reviews 
The movie received negative reviews. The Indian Express stated that the film was "a pure crime". According to Shalini Lingar, the movie shows too many sex scenes and did not effectively convey the message of the film. According to Surya Agarwal from Hindustan Times, the sale of Gandhi Topi and Kurta went up due to this film. Mihir Bhanage from Times of India wrote in his review that 'Gandhigiri can be given a miss'.

References

External links
 
 

Films about Mahatma Gandhi
2010s Hindi-language films
Indian drama films
2016 films
2016 drama films
Hindi-language drama films